was one of 18   escort destroyers built for the Imperial Japanese Navy (IJN) during World War II. Completed in early 1945, the ship was deployed to northern Japan for convoy escort duties in May. She was badly damaged during the American attacks on Hokkaido and northern Honshu in mid-July and was further damaged when they repeated those attacks on 9 August. Yanagi was scrapped in 1947.

Design and description
Designed for ease of production, the Matsu class was smaller, slower and more lightly armed than previous destroyers as the IJN intended them for second-line duties like escorting convoys, releasing the larger ships for missions with the fleet. Their crew numbered 210 officers and enlisted men. The ships had two Kampon geared steam turbines, each driving one propeller shaft, using steam provided by two Kampon water-tube boilers.

The main armament of the Matsu-class ships consisted of three  Type 89 dual-purpose guns in one twin-gun mount aft and one single mount forward of the superstructure. The single mount was partially protected against spray by a gun shield. The accuracy of the Type 89 guns was severely reduced against aircraft because no high-angle gunnery director was fitted. The ships carried a total of twenty-five  Type 96 anti-aircraft guns in 4 triple and 13 single mounts. The Matsus were equipped with Type 13 early-warning and Type 22 surface-search radars. The ships were also armed with a single rotating quadruple mount amidships for  torpedoes. They could deliver their 36 depth charges via two stern rails and two throwers.

Construction and career
Authorized in the late 1942 Modified 5th Naval Armaments Supplement Program, Yanagi (willow) was laid down by Fujinagata Shipyards on 20 August 1944 in its Osaka facility and launched on 25 November. Upon her completion on 18 January 1945, the ship was assigned to Destroyer Squadron 11 of the Combined Fleet for working up. Upon the completion of her training, the ship was assigned to the squadron's Destroyer Division 53. The squadron was briefly attached to the Second Fleet on 1–20 April before rejoining the Combined Fleet.

On 22 May, Yanagi was transferred to the Ominato area for convoy escort duties. During attacks by Task Force 38 on Hokkaido and northern Honshu on 14 July, the ship had her stern blown off when she was attacked by carrier aircraft in the Tsugaru Strait. Her crew casualties are unknown, but the destroyer was towed to Ominato. Destroyer Division 53 was disbanded the following day. Yanagi was still in Ominato when Task Force 38 conducted further attacks in the Hokkaido area on 9–10 August and was further damaged. The ship was turned over to Allied forces at Hakodate at the time of the surrender of Japan on 2 September and was stricken from the navy list on 20 November. Unrepaired, she was broken up at Ominato on 1 April 1947.

Notes

Bibliography

 

 
 

Matsu-class destroyers
Ships built by Fujinagata Shipyards
World War II destroyers of Japan
1944 ships